The 2014–15 Turkish Basketball League, was the 49th season of the top professional basketball league in Turkey.

The season started on October 11, 2014 and finished June 19, 2015. Fenerbahçe Ülker were the defending champions. Pınar Karşıyaka took the title, winning their second ever championship. Anadolu Efes were runners-up.

Clubs and arenas

Regular season

League table

Results
{| style="font-size: 85%; text-align: center" class="wikitable"
|-
|
|  style="text-align:center; width:50px;"|AEF
| width=50|TED
| width=50|BAN
| width=50|BJK
| width=50|DAÇ
| width=50|ESK
| width=50|FBÜ
| width=50|GSL
| width=50|İBB
| width=50|KSK
| width=50|RHG
| width=50|SEÜ
| width=50|TOF
| width=50|TTS
| width=50|TSB
| width=50|UŞK
|-
|align=left|Anadolu Efes
| style="background:#ccc;"|
| style="background:#fcc;"| 73–81
| style="background:#cfc;"| 89–83
| style="background:#cfc;"| 83–79
| style="background:#cfc;"| 73–72
| style="background:#cfc;"| 96–68
| style="background:#cfc;"| 85–67
| style="background:#cfc;"| 77–75
| style="background:#cfc;"| 71–64
| style="background:#cfc;"| 67–65
| style="background:#cfc;"| 77–67
| style="background:#cfc;"| 90–73
| style="background:#cfc;"| 89–76
| style="background:#fcc;"| 86–91
| style="background:#cfc;"| 70–66
| style="background:#cfc;"| 81–66
|-
|align=left|Aykon TED Kolejliler
| style="background:#fcc;"| 67–69
| style="background:#ccc;"|
| style="background:#fcc;"| 79–80
| style="background:#fcc;"| 83–88
| style="background:#fcc;"| 70–82
| style="background:#cfc;"| 81–72
| style="background:#fcc;"| 62–71
| style="background:#fcc;"| 67–75
| style="background:#fcc;"| 73–84
| style="background:#cfc;"| 94–92
| style="background:#cfc;"| 113–112
| style="background:#fcc;"| 87–90
| style="background:#cfc;"| 79–76
| style="background:#fcc;"| 70–72
| style="background:#fcc;"| 78–89
| style="background:#cfc;"| 88–84
|-
|align=left|Banvit
| style="background:#cfc;"| 77–74
| style="background:#cfc;"| 74–67
| style="background:#ccc;"|
| style="background:#fcc;"| 80–81
| style="background:#cfc;"| 72–69
| style="background:#cfc;"| 91–75
| style="background:#cfc;"| 82–77
| style="background:#cfc;"| 69–67
| style="background:#fcc;"| 63–69
| style="background:#fcc;"| 87–89
| style="background:#cfc;"| 70–69
| style="background:#fcc;"| 89–99
| style="background:#cfc;"| 76–62
| style="background:#cfc;"| 86–75
| style="background:#fcc;"| 93–97
| style="background:#cfc;"| 77–64
|-
|align=left|Beşiktaş İntegral Forex
| style="background:#fcc;"| 77–78
| style="background:#cfc;"| 94–81
| style="background:#cfc;"| 96–87
| style="background:#ccc;"|
| style="background:#fcc;"| 68–84
| style="background:#cfc;"| 87–79
| style="background:#fcc;"| 74–94
| style="background:#fcc;"| 64–65
| style="background:#cfc;"| 80–66
| style="background:#cfc;"| 87–82
| style="background:#fcc;"| 70–81
| style="background:#cfc;"| 84–74
| style="background:#fcc;"| 65–72
| style="background:#cfc;"| 76–59
| style="background:#cfc;"| 68–58
| style="background:#cfc;"| 86–67
|-
|align=left|Darüşşafaka Doğuş
| style="background:#fcc;"| 61–83
| style="background:#fcc;"| 91–93
| style="background:#cfc;"| 69–67
| style="background:#cfc;"| 74–71
| style="background:#ccc;"|
| style="background:#fcc;"| 82–89
| style="background:#fcc;"| 51–73
| style="background:#fcc;"| 77–79
| style="background:#cfc;"| 83–61
| style="background:#cfc;"| 82–66
| style="background:#cfc;"| 64–46
| style="background:#cfc;"| 84–57
| style="background:#cfc;"| 88–61
| style="background:#cfc;"| 108–82
| style="background:#cfc;"| 88–68
| style="background:#cfc;"| 80–67
|-
|align=left|Eskişehir Basket
| style="background:#cfc;"| 81–79
| style="background:#cfc;"| 97–85
| style="background:#cfc;"| 89–81
| style="background:#cfc;"| 82–81
| style="background:#fcc;"| 66–90
| style="background:#ccc;"|
| style="background:#fcc;"| 69–89
| style="background:#cfc;"| 66–61
| style="background:#cfc;"| 81–69
| style="background:#fcc;"| 62–91
| style="background:#cfc;"| 92–81
| style="background:#fcc;"| 68–89
| style="background:#fcc;"| 78–80
| style="background:#cfc;"| 88–79
| style="background:#fcc;"| 80–83
| style="background:#fcc;"| 61–69
|-
|align=left|Fenerbahçe Ülker
| style="background:#fcc;"| 82–84
| style="background:#cfc;"| 78–65
| style="background:#cfc;"| 99–92
| style="background:#cfc;"| 97–59
| style="background:#fcc;"| 91–95
| style="background:#cfc;"| 86–76
| style="background:#ccc;"|
| style="background:#cfc;"| 85–74
| style="background:#cfc;"| 91–89
| style="background:#cfc;"| 70–62
| style="background:#fcc;"| 66–70
| style="background:#cfc;"| 98–61
| style="background:#cfc;"| 80–70
| style="background:#cfc;"| 86–82
| style="background:#cfc;"| 67–61
| style="background:#cfc;"| 89–75
|-
|align=left|Galatasaray Liv Hospital
| style="background:#cfc;"| 77–76
| style="background:#fcc;"| 84–88
| style="background:#cfc;"| 87–79
| style="background:#cfc;"| 100–94
| style="background:#fcc;"| 76–91
| style="background:#cfc;"| 86–69
| style="background:#cfc;"| 92–88
| style="background:#ccc;"| 
| style="background:#fcc;"| 81–84
| style="background:#fcc;"| 70–75
| style="background:#cfc;"| 80–74
| style="background:#cfc;"| 81–80
| style="background:#fcc;"| 87–98
| style="background:#fcc;"| 76–80
| style="background:#fcc;"| 80–93
| style="background:#cfc;"| 94–85
|-
|align=left|İstanbul BB
| style="background:#fcc;"| 64–106
| style="background:#fcc;"| 70–71
| style="background:#fcc;"| 71–81
| style="background:#fcc;"| 77–81
| style="background:#fcc;"| 74–76
| style="background:#cfc;"| 87–84
| style="background:#fcc;"| 60–95
| style="background:#fcc;"| 80–87
| style="background:#ccc;"|
| style="background:#cfc;"| 68–62
| style="background:#cfc;"| 91–86
| style="background:#cfc;"| 91–88
| style="background:#cfc;"| 85–78
| style="background:#fcc;"| 62–74
| style="background:#fcc;"| 69–78
| style="background:#cfc;"| 84–75
|-
|align=left|Pınar Karşıyaka
| style="background:#cfc;"| 92–84
| style="background:#cfc;"| 96–89
| style="background:#cfc;"| 64–60
| style="background:#fcc;"| 79–81
| style="background:#fcc;"| 79–80
| style="background:#cfc;"| 82–76
| style="background:#fcc;"| 69–75
| style="background:#cfc;"| 84–77
| style="background:#cfc;"| 108–84
| style="background:#ccc;"|
| style="background:#fcc;"| 66–71
| style="background:#cfc;"| 75–68
| style="background:#cfc;"| 93–80
| style="background:#cfc;"| 76–65
| style="background:#fcc;"| 87–91
| style="background:#cfc;"| 88–80
|-
|align=left|Royal Halı Gaziantep
| style="background:#cfc;"| 65–63
| style="background:#cfc;"| 82–60
| style="background:#fcc;"| 64–68
| style="background:#fcc;"| 81–88
| style="background:#fcc;"| 69–72
| style="background:#cfc;"| 88–80
| style="background:#fcc;"| 59–71
| style="background:#cfc;"| 76–64
| style="background:#cfc;"| 78–49
| style="background:#fcc;"| 65–81
| style="background:#ccc;"|
| style="background:#cfc;"| 87–78
| style="background:#cfc;"| 69–51
| style="background:#cfc;"| 88–77
| style="background:#cfc;"| 77–69
| style="background:#cfc;"| 84–81
|-
|align=left|Selçuk Üniversitesi
| style="background:#fcc;"| 64–74
| style="background:#cfc;"| 89–75
| style="background:#cfc;"| 83–75
| style="background:#fcc;"| 79–84
| style="background:#fcc;"| 69–88
| style="background:#cfc;"| 92–89
| style="background:#fcc;"| 80–82
| style="background:#fcc;"| 84–91
| style="background:#cfc;"| 85–82
| style="background:#fcc;"| 93–100
| style="background:#cfc;"| 70–69
| style="background:#ccc;"|
| style="background:#cfc;"| 88–81
| style="background:#fcc;"| 97–100
| style="background:#fcc;"| 74–92
| style="background:#cfc;"| 89–86
|-
|align=left|Tofaş
| style="background:#fcc;"| 70–93
| style="background:#fcc;"| 71–92
| style="background:#fcc;"| 67–95
| style="background:#cfc;"| 91–83
| style="background:#fcc;"| 68–74
| style="background:#cfc;"| 88–79
| style="background:#fcc;"| 77–86
| style="background:#fcc;"| 73–93
| style="background:#fcc;"| 67–76
| style="background:#fcc;"| 65–73
| style="background:#cfc;"| 93–76
| style="background:#cfc;"| 75–47
| style="background:#ccc;"|
| style="background:#fcc;"| 67–72
| style="background:#cfc;"| 91–84
| style="background:#fcc;"| 77–80
|-
|align=left|Türk Telekom
| style="background:#fcc;"| 67–88
| style="background:#fcc;"| 80–89
| style="background:#fcc;"| 83–88
| style="background:#cfc;"| 79–70
| style="background:#cfc;"| 82–81
| style="background:#cfc;"| 97–92
| style="background:#fcc;"| 61–73
| style="background:#cfc;"| 85–77
| style="background:#fcc;"| 88–89
| style="background:#fcc;"| 66–83
| style="background:#cfc;"| 79–73
| style="background:#cfc;"| 83–72
| style="background:#cfc;"| 94–75
| style="background:#ccc;"|
| style="background:#fcc;"| 81–100
| style="background:#cfc;"| 90–82
|-
|align=left|Trabzonspor Medical Park
| style="background:#fcc;"| 71–97
| style="background:#cfc;"| 88–73
| style="background:#fcc;"| 66–71
| style="background:#cfc;"| 98–75
| style="background:#fcc;"| 67–75
| style="background:#cfc;"| 93–91
| style="background:#fcc;"| 75–87
| style="background:#cfc;"| 72–70
| style="background:#cfc;"| 92–88
| style="background:#fcc;"| 73–75
| style="background:#fcc;"| 74–88
| style="background:#fcc;"| 70–76
| style="background:#cfc;"| 93–80
| style="background:#cfc;"| 86–76
| style="background:#ccc;"|
| style="background:#cfc;"| 114–88
|-
|align=left|Uşak Sportif
| style="background:#cfc;"| 76–75
| style="background:#cfc;"| 91–83
| style="background:#cfc;"| 75–61
| style="background:#cfc;"| 70–66
| style="background:#cfc;"| 80–73
| style="background:#cfc;"| 103–90
| style="background:#cfc;"| 78–69
| style="background:#fcc;"| 79–86
| style="background:#fcc;"| 66–71
| style="background:#fcc;"| 78–88
| style="background:#cfc;"| 76–70
| style="background:#fcc;"| 82–86
| style="background:#cfc;"| 80–75
| style="background:#fcc;"| 76–79
| style="background:#cfc;"| 81–78
| style="background:#ccc;"|
|-

Playoffs

Individual statistics

Points

Rebounds

Assists

Blocks

Steals

Turkish Basketball League clubs in European competitions

All-Star Game

Awards

Finals MVP
  Bobby Dixon – Pınar Karşıyaka

All-Star Game MVP
  Carlos Arroyo – Galatasaray Liv Hospital

See also
 2014–15 Turkish Basketball Cup

References

External links
 Official Site
 TBLStat.net League History 2014-2015 Season

Turkish Basketball Super League seasons
Turkish
1